The Labours of Hercules or Labours of Heracles  are a series of episodes concerning a penance carried out by Heracles, the greatest of the Greek heroes, whose name was later romanised as Hercules. They were accomplished at the service of King Eurystheus. The episodes were later connected by a continuous narrative. 

The establishment of a fixed cycle of twelve labours was attributed by the Greeks to an epic poem, now lost, written by Peisander, dated about 600 BC. 

Having tried to kill Heracles ever since he was born, Hera induced a madness in him that made him kill his wife and children. Afterwards, Heracles went to the Oracle of Delphi to atone, where he prayed to the god Apollo for guidance. Heracles was told to serve Eurystheus, king of Mycenae, for ten years. During this time, he was sent to perform a series of difficult feats, called labours.

History of Heracles

Driven mad by Hera  (queen of the gods), Heracles slew his sons and his wife, Megara. Although, according to Euripides in Herakles, it was not until after Heracles had completed his labours and on his return from the Underworld that he murdered Megara and his children. 

After recovering his sanity, Heracles deeply regretted his actions; he was purified by King Thespius, then traveled to Delphi to inquire how he could atone for his actions. Pythia, the Oracle of Delphi, advised him to go to Tiryns and serve his cousin, King Eurystheus, for ten years, performing whatever labours Eurystheus might set him; in return, he would be rewarded with immortality. 

Heracles despaired at this, loathing to serve a man whom he knew to be far inferior to himself, yet fearing to oppose his father Zeus. Eventually, he placed himself at Eurystheus's disposal.

Eurystheus originally ordered Heracles to perform ten labours. Heracles accomplished these tasks, but Eurystheus refused to recognize two: the slaying of the Lernaean Hydra, as Heracles' nephew and charioteer Iolaus had helped him; and the cleansing of the Augean stables, because Heracles accepted payment for the labour or in some versions of this story it was the Stymphalian Birds that was discounted instead of the Augean stables for the help of Athena giving him bronze rattles.

Eurystheus set two more tasks (fetching the Golden Apples of Hesperides and capturing Cerberus), which Heracles also performed, bringing the total number of tasks to twelve.

The twelve labours

As they survive, the labours of Heracles are not recounted in any single place, but must be reassembled from many sources. Ruck and Staples assert that there is no one way to interpret the labours, but that six were located in the Peloponnese, culminating with the rededication of Olympia. 

Six others took the hero farther afield, to places that were, per Ruck, "all previously strongholds of Hera or the 'Goddess' and were Entrances to the Netherworld". In each case, the pattern was the same: Heracles was sent to kill or subdue, or to fetch back for Eurystheus (as Hera's representative) a magical animal or plant.

A famous depiction of the labours in Greek sculpture is found on the metopes of the Temple of Zeus at Olympia, which date to the 460s BC.

In his labours, Heracles was sometimes accompanied by a male companion (an eromenos), according to Licymnius and others, such as Iolaus, his nephew. Although he was supposed to perform only ten labours, this assistance led to two labours being disqualified: Eurystheus refused to recognize slaying the Hydra, because Iolaus helped him, and the cleansing of the Augean stables, because Heracles was paid for his services and/or because the rivers did the work. Several of the labours involved the offspring (by various accounts) of Typhon and his mate Echidna, all overcome by Heracles.

A traditional order of the labours found in the Bibliotheca by Pseudo-Apollodorus is:
 Slay the Nemean lion.
 Slay the nine-headed Lernaean Hydra.
 Capture the Ceryneian Hind.
 Capture the Erymanthian Boar.
 Clean the Augean stables in a single day.
 Slay the Stymphalian birds.
 Capture the Cretan Bull.
 Steal the Mares of Diomedes.
 Obtain the girdle of Hippolyta, queen of the Amazon.
 Obtain the cattle of the three-bodied giant Geryon.
 Steal three of the golden apples of the Hesperides.
 Capture and bring back Cerberus.

First: Nemean lion

Heracles wandered in the area until he came to the town of Cleonae. There he met a boy who said that if Heracles slew the Nemean lion and returned alive within 30 days, the town would sacrifice a lion to Zeus, but if he did not return within 30 days or if he died, the boy would sacrifice himself to Zeus. Another version claims that he met Molorchos, a shepherd who had lost his son to the lion, saying that if he came back within 30 days, a ram would be sacrificed to Zeus. If he did not return within 30 days, it would be sacrificed to the dead Heracles as a mourning offering.

While searching for the lion, Heracles fletched some arrows to use against it, not knowing that its golden fur was impenetrable. When he found and shot the lion, firing at it with his bow, Heracles discovered the fur's protective property as the arrow bounced harmlessly off the creature's thigh. After some time, Heracles made the lion return to his cave. The cave had two entrances, one of which Heracles blocked; he then entered the other. In those dark and close quarters, Heracles stunned the beast with his club and, using his immense strength, strangled it to death. During the fight the lion bit off one of his fingers. Others say that he shot arrows at it, eventually shooting it in the unarmored mouth. After slaying the lion, he tried to skin it with a knife from his belt, but failed. He then tried sharpening the knife with a stone and even tried with the stone itself. Finally, Athena, noticing the hero's plight, told Heracles to use one of the lion's own claws to skin the pelt. Others say that Heracles' armor was, in fact, the hide of the Lion of Cithaeron.

When he returned on the 30th day carrying the carcass of the lion on his shoulders, King Eurystheus was amazed and terrified. Eurystheus forbade him ever again to enter the city; from then on he was to display the fruits of his labours outside the city gates. Eurystheus would then tell Heracles his tasks through a herald, not personally. Eurystheus even had a large bronze jar made for him in which to hide from Heracles if need be. Eurystheus then warned him that the tasks would become increasingly difficult.

Second: Lernaean Hydra

Heracles' second labour was to slay the Lernaean Hydra, which Hera had raised with the sole purpose of slaying Heracles. Upon reaching the swamp near Lake Lerna, where the Hydra dwelt, Heracles used a cloth to cover his mouth and nose to protect himself from the poisonous fumes. He fired flaming arrows into the Hydra's lair, the spring of Amymone, a deep cave that the beast only came out of to terrorize neighboring villages. Angered by the flaming arrows, the Hydra emerged from its lair. Wielding a harvesting sickle (according to some early vase-paintings), a sword or his famed club, Heracles engaged the Hydra in combat. Ruck and Staples (1994: 170) note that the chthonic creature's reaction was botanical in nature: upon cutting off each of its heads, Heracles observed that the beast promptly re-grew each decapitated head, rendering every slash and cleaving blow futile. Additionally, one of the Hydra's heads - the middle one - was immortal.

The details of the struggle are explicit in the Bibliotheca (2.5.2): realizing that he could not defeat the Hydra in this way, Heracles called on his nephew Iolaus for help. Iolaus then came upon the idea (possibly inspired by Athena) of using a firebrand to scorch the neck stumps after each decapitation. Working in tandem, Heracles cut off each head and Iolaus cauterized the open stumps. Seeing that Heracles was winning the struggle, Hera sent a giant crab to distract him; however, this turned out to be in vain, as he promptly crushed it under his mighty foot. Lastly, having weakened the beast considerably, Heracles cut off the Hydra's one immortal head with a golden sword given to him by Athena. It is said that Heracles placed the immortal head under a great rock on the sacred way between Lerna and Elaius to keep the beast from enacting further harm (Kerenyi 1959:144), and once this was done, he dipped his arrows in the Hydra's poisonous blood. An alternative version of this myth relates that after cutting off one of the Hydra's heads, Heracles dipped his sword in the gaping wound and used its venom to cauterize each subsequent stump so that it could not grow back. Hera, upset that Heracles had slain the beast she raised to kill him, is said to have placed it in the dark blue vault of the sky as the constellation Hydra. She then turned the crab into the constellation Cancer.

Later, Heracles used an arrow dipped in the Hydra's poisonous blood to kill the centaur Nessus; and Nessus's tainted blood was applied to the Tunic of Nessus, by which the centaur had his posthumous revenge. Both Strabo and Pausanias report that the stench of the river Anigrus in Elis, making all the fish of the river inedible, was reputed to be due to the Hydra's venom, washed from the arrows Heracles used on the centaur.

Third: Ceryneian Hind

Angered by Heracles' success against the Nemean Lion and the Lernaean Hydra, Eurystheus (advised by Hera) devised an altogether different task for the hero, commanding Heracles to capture the Ceryneian Hind, a beast so fast it could outpace an arrow. 

After a long search, Heracles awoke one night and laid eyes on the elusive hind, which was only visible due to the glint of moonlight on its antlers. He then chased the hind on foot for a full year through Greece, Thrace, Istria, and the land of the Hyperboreans. How Heracles caught the hind differs depending on the telling; in most versions, he captured the hind while it slept, rendering it lame with a trap net. 

Eurystheus commanded Heracles to catch the hind in the hope that it would enrage Artemis and lead her to punish the hero for his desecration of the sacred animal. As he was returning with the hind to present it to Eurystheus, Heracles encountered Artemis and her brother Apollo. He begged the goddess for forgiveness, explaining that he had snared the hind as part of his penance, but promised to return it to the wild soon thereafter. Convinced by Heracles' earnestness, Artemis forgave him, foiling Eurystheus' plan. 

After bringing the hind to Eurystheus, Heracles was informed that it was to become part of the King's menagerie. Knowing that he must return the hind to the wild as he had promised Artemis, Heracles agreed to hand it over only on the condition that Eurystheus himself come out and take it from him. The King came forth, but the moment that Heracles let the hind go, it sprinted back to its mistress with unparalleled swiftness. Before taking his leave, Heracles snidely commented that Eurystheus had not been quick enough, leaving the King fuming.

Fourth: Erymanthian Boar

Eurystheus was disappointed that Heracles had overcome yet another creature and was humiliated by the hind's escape, so he assigned Heracles another dangerous task. By some accounts, the fourth labour was to bring the fearsome Erymanthian Boar back to Eurystheus alive (there is no single definitive telling of the labours). On the way to Mount Erymanthos where the boar lived, Heracles visited Pholus ("caveman"), a kind and hospitable centaur and old friend. Heracles ate with Pholus in his cavern (though the centaur devoured his meat raw) and asked for wine. Pholus had only one jar of wine, a gift from Dionysus to all the centaurs on Mount Erymanthos. Heracles convinced him to open it, and the smell attracted the other centaurs. They did not understand that wine needs to be tempered with water, became drunk, and attacked Heracles. Heracles shot at them with his poisonous arrows, killing many, and the centaurs retreated all the way to Chiron's cave.

Pholus was curious why the arrows caused so much death. He picked one up but dropped it, and the arrow stabbed his hoof, poisoning him. One version states that a stray arrow hit Chiron as well. He was immortal, but he still felt the pain. Chiron's pain was so great that he volunteered to give up his immortality and take the place of Prometheus, who had been chained to the top of a mountain to have his liver eaten daily by an eagle. Prometheus' torturer, the eagle, continued its torture on Chiron, so Heracles shot it dead with an arrow. It is generally accepted that the tale was meant to show Heracles as being the recipient of Chiron's surrendered immortality. However, this tale contradicts the tradition that Chiron later taught Achilles. The tale of the centaurs sometimes appears in other parts of the twelve labours, as does the freeing of Prometheus.

Heracles had visited Chiron to gain advice on how to catch the boar, and Chiron had told him to drive it into thick snow, which sets this labour in mid-winter. Heracles caught the boar, bound it, and carried it back to Eurystheus, who was frightened of it and ducked down in his half-buried storage pithos, begging Heracles to get rid of the beast.

Fifth: Augean stables

The fifth labour was to clean the stables of King Augeas.  This assignment was intended to be both humiliating and impossible, since these divine livestock were immortal, and had produced an enormous quantity of dung.  The Augean stables had not been cleaned in over 30 years, and over 1,000 cattle lived there.  However, Heracles succeeded by rerouting the rivers Alpheus and Peneus to wash out the filth.

Before starting on the task, Heracles had asked Augeas for one-tenth of the cattle if he finished the task in one day, and Augeas agreed, but afterwards Augeas refused to honour the agreement on the grounds that Heracles had been ordered to carry out the task by Eurystheus anyway.  Heracles claimed his reward in court, and was supported by Augeas' son Phyleus.  Augeas banished them both before the court had ruled.  Heracles returned, slew Augeas, and gave his kingdom to Phyleus.

The success of this labour was ultimately discounted as the rushing waters had done the work of cleaning the stables, and because Heracles was paid for doing the labour; Eurystheus determined that Heracles still had seven labours to perform.

Sixth: Stymphalian birds

The sixth labour was to defeat the Stymphalian birds, man-eating birds with beaks made of bronze and sharp metallic feathers they could launch at their victims. They were sacred to Ares, the god of war. Furthermore, their dung was highly toxic. They had migrated to Lake Stymphalia in Arcadia, where they bred quickly and took over the countryside, destroying local crops, fruit trees, and townspeople. Heracles could not go too far into the swamp, for it would not support his weight. Athena, noticing the hero's plight, gave Heracles a rattle which Hephaestus had made especially for the occasion. Heracles shook the rattle and frightened the birds into the air. Heracles then shot many of them with his arrows. The rest flew far away, never to return. In some versions of this story instead of the Augean stables being discounted it was the Stymphalian Birds labour for getting the help of Athena. The Argonauts would later encounter them.

Seventh: Cretan Bull
 

The seventh labour, also categorised as the first of the Non-Peloponneisan labours, was to capture the Cretan Bull, father of the Minotaur. Heracles sailed to Crete, where King Minos gave Heracles permission to take the bull away and even offered him assistance (which Heracles declined, plausibly because he did not want the labour to be discounted as before). The bull had been wreaking havoc on Crete by uprooting crops and leveling orchard walls. Heracles snuck up behind the bull and then used his hands to throttle it (stopping before it was killed), and then shipped it back to Tiryns. Eurystheus, who hid in his pithos at first sight of the creature, wanted to sacrifice the bull to Hera, who hated Heracles. She refused the sacrifice because it reflected glory on Heracles. The bull was released and wandered into Marathon, becoming known as the Marathonian Bull. Theseus would later sacrifice the bull to Athena and/or Apollo.

Eighth: Mares of Diomedes

As the eighth of his labours Heracles was sent by King Eurystheus to steal the Mares from Diomedes. The mares’ madness was attributed to their unnatural diet which consisted of the flesh of unsuspecting guests or strangers to the island. Some versions of the myth say that the mares also expelled fire when they breathed. The Mares, which were the terror of Thrace, were kept tethered by iron chains to a bronze manger in the now vanished city of Tirida and were named Podargos (the swift), Lampon (the shining), Xanthos (the yellow) and Deinos (or Deinus, the terrible). Although very similar, there are slight variances in the exact details regarding the mares’ capture.

In one version, Heracles brought a number of volunteers to help him capture the giant horses. After overpowering Diomedes’ men, Heracles broke the chains that tethered the horses and drove the mares down to sea. Unaware that the mares were man-eating and uncontrollable, Heracles left them in the charge of his favored companion, Abderus, while he left to fight Diomedes. Upon his return, Heracles found that the boy was eaten. As revenge, Heracles fed Diomedes to his own horses and then founded Abdera next to the boy's tomb.

In another version, Heracles, who was visiting the island, stayed awake so that he didn't have his throat cut by Diomedes in the night, and cut the chains binding the horses once everyone was asleep. Having scared the horses onto the high ground of a knoll, Heracles quickly dug a trench through the peninsula, filling it with water and thus flooding the low-lying plain. When Diomedes and his men turned to flee, Heracles killed them with an axe (or a club), and fed Diomedes’ body to the horses to calm them.

In yet another version, Heracles first captured Diomedes and fed him to the mares before releasing them. Only after realizing that their King was dead did his men, the Bistonians, attack Heracles. Upon seeing the mares charging at them, led in a chariot by Abderus, the Bistonians turned and fled.

In all versions the horses are calmed by eating human flesh, giving Heracles the opportunity to bind their mouths shut and easily take them back to King Eurystheus, who dedicated the horses to Hera. In some versions, they were allowed to roam freely around Argos, having become permanently calm, but in others, Eurystheus ordered the horses taken to Olympus to be sacrificed to Zeus, but Zeus refused them, and sent wolves, lions, and bears to kill them. Roger Lancelyn Green states in his Tales of the Greek Heroes that the mares’ descendants were used in the Trojan War, and survived even to the time of Alexander the Great. After the incident, Eurystheus sent Heracles to bring back Hippolyta's Girdle.

Ninth: Belt of Hippolyta

Eurystheus' daughter Admete wanted the Belt of Hippolyta, queen of the Amazons, a gift from her father Ares. To please his daughter, Eurystheus ordered Heracles to retrieve the belt as his ninth labour.

Taking a band of friends with him, Heracles set sail, stopping at the island of Paros, which was inhabited by some sons of Minos. The sons killed two of Heracles' companions, an act which set Heracles on a rampage. He killed two of the sons of Minos and threatened the other inhabitants until he was offered two men to replace his fallen companions. Heracles agreed and took two of Minos' grandsons, Alcaeus and Sthenelus. They continued their voyage and landed at the court of Lycus, whom Heracles defended in a battle against King Mygdon of Bebryces. After killing King Mygdon, Heracles gave much of the land to his friend Lycus. Lycus called the land Heraclea. The crew then set off for Themiscyra, where Hippolyta lived.

All would have gone well for Heracles had it not been for Hera. Hippolyta, impressed with Heracles and his exploits, agreed to give him the belt and would have done so had Hera not disguised herself and walked among the Amazons sowing seeds of distrust. She claimed the strangers were plotting to carry off the queen of the Amazons. Alarmed, the women set off on horseback to confront Heracles. When Heracles saw them, he thought Hippolyta had been plotting such treachery all along and had never meant to hand over the belt, so he killed her, took the belt and returned to Eurystheus.

Tenth: Cattle of Geryon

The tenth labour was to obtain the Cattle of the three-bodied giant Geryon. In the fullest account in the Bibliotheca of Pseudo-Apollodorus, Heracles had to go to the island of Erytheia in the far west (sometimes identified with the Hesperides, or with the island which forms the city of Cádiz) to get the cattle. On the way there, he crossed the Libyan desert and became so frustrated at the heat that he shot an arrow at the Sun. The sun-god Helios "in admiration of his courage" gave Heracles the golden cup Helios used to sail across the sea from west to east each night. Heracles rode the cup to Erytheia; Heracles in the cup was a favorite motif on black-figure pottery. Such a magical conveyance undercuts any literal geography for Erytheia, the "red island" of the sunset.

When Heracles landed at Erytheia, he was confronted by the two-headed dog Orthrus. With one blow from his olive-wood club, Heracles killed Orthrus. Eurytion the herdsman came to assist Orthrus, but Heracles dealt with him the same way.

On hearing the commotion, Geryon sprang into action, carrying three shields and three spears, and wearing three helmets. He attacked Heracles at the River Anthemus, but was slain by one of Heracles' poisoned arrows. Heracles shot so forcefully that the arrow pierced Geryon's forehead, "and Geryon bent his neck over to one side, like a poppy that spoils its delicate shapes, shedding its petals all at once."

Heracles then had to herd the cattle back to Eurystheus. In Roman versions of the narrative, Heracles drove the cattle over the Aventine Hill on the future site of Rome. The giant Cacus, who lived there, stole some of the cattle as Heracles slept, making the cattle walk backwards so that they left no trail, a repetition of the trick of the young Hermes. According to some versions, Heracles drove his remaining cattle past the cave, where Cacus had hidden the stolen animals, and they began calling out to each other. In other versions, Cacus' sister Caca told Heracles where he was. Heracles then killed Cacus, and set up an altar on the spot, later the site of Rome's Forum Boarium (the cattle market).

To annoy Heracles, Hera sent a gadfly to bite the cattle, irritate them, and scatter them. Within a year, Heracles retrieved them. Hera then sent a flood which raised the level of a river so much that Heracles could not cross with the cattle. He piled stones into the river to make the water shallower. When he finally reached the court of Eurystheus, the cattle were sacrificed to Hera.

Eleventh: Golden Apples of the Hesperides

After Heracles completed the first ten labours, Eurystheus gave him two more, claiming that slaying the Hydra did not count (because Iolaus helped Heracles), neither did cleaning the Augean Stables (either because he was paid for the job or because the rivers did the work).

The first additional labour was to steal three of the golden apples from the garden of the Hesperides. Heracles first caught the Old Man of the Sea, the shapeshifting sea god, to learn where the Garden of the Hesperides was located.

In some variations, Heracles, either at the start or at the end of this task, meets Antaeus, who was invincible as long as he touched his mother, Gaia, the Earth. Heracles killed Antaeus by holding him aloft and crushing him in a bear hug.

Herodotus claims that Heracles stopped in Egypt, where King Busiris decided to make him the yearly sacrifice, but Heracles burst out of his chains.

Heracles finally made his way to the garden of the Hesperides, where he encountered Atlas holding up the heavens on his shoulders. Heracles persuaded Atlas to get the three golden Apples for him by offering to hold up the heavens in his place for a little while. Atlas could get the apples because, in this version, he was the father or otherwise related to the Hesperides. When Atlas returned, he decided that he did not want to take the heavens back, and instead offered to deliver the apples himself, but Heracles tricked him by agreeing to remain in place of Atlas on the condition that Atlas relieve him temporarily while Heracles adjusted his cloak. Atlas agreed, but Heracles reneged and walked away with the apples. According to an alternative version, Heracles slew Ladon, the dragon who guarded the apples, instead. Eurystheus was furious that Heracles had accomplished something that Eurystheus thought could not possibly be done.

Twelfth: Cerberus

The twelfth and final labour was the capture of Cerberus, the multi-headed dog that was the guardian of the gates of the Underworld. To prepare for his descent into the Underworld, Heracles went to Eleusis (or Athens) to be initiated in the Eleusinian Mysteries. He entered the Underworld, and Hermes and Athena were his guides.

While in the Underworld, Heracles met Theseus and Pirithous. The two companions had been imprisoned by Hades for attempting to kidnap Persephone. One tradition tells of snakes coiling around their legs, then turning into stone. Another that Hades feigned hospitality and prepared a feast inviting them to sit; they unknowingly sat in chairs of forgetfulness and were permanently ensnared. When Heracles had pulled Theseus first from his chair, some of his thigh stuck to it (this explains the supposedly lean thighs of Athenians), but the Earth shook at the attempt to liberate Pirithous, whose desire to have the goddess for himself was so insulting he was doomed to stay behind.

Heracles found Hades and asked permission to bring Cerberus to the surface, which Hades agreed to if Heracles could subdue the beast without using weapons. Heracles overpowered Cerberus with his bare hands and slung the beast over his back. He carried Cerberus out of the Underworld through a cavern entrance in the Peloponnese and brought it to Eurystheus, who again fled into his pithos.  Eurystheus begged Heracles to return Cerberus to the Underworld, offering in return to release him from any further labours when Cerberus disappeared back to his master.

Aftermath

After completing the twelve labours, one tradition says Heracles joined Jason and the Argonauts in their quest for the Golden Fleece. However, Herodorus (c. 400 BC) disputed this and denied Heracles ever sailed with the Argonauts. A separate tradition (e.g. Argonautica) has Heracles accompany the Argonauts, but he did not travel with them as far as Colchis.

According to Euripides' play Herakles, it is at this point after his labours are completed and he is returning home to meet his wife and family that he is driven mad and kills them, after which he is exiled from Thebes and leaves to Athens.

Allegorical interpretation
Some ancient Greeks found allegorical meanings of a moral, psychological or philosophical nature in the Labours of Heracles.  This trend became more prominent in the Renaissance.  For example, Heraclitus the Grammarian wrote in his Homeric Problems:

See also
 Angim
 Copreus of Elis
 Rostam's Seven Labours

Notes

References
 Apollodorus, Apollodorus, The Library, with an English Translation by Sir James George Frazer, F.B.A., F.R.S. in 2 Volumes. Cambridge, Massachusetts, Harvard University Press; London, William Heinemann Ltd. 1921. Online version at the Perseus Digital Library.
 
 Gantz, Timothy, Early Greek Myth: A Guide to Literary and Artistic Sources, Johns Hopkins University Press, 1996, Two volumes:  (Vol. 1),  (Vol. 2).
 Hard, Robin, The Routledge Handbook of Greek Mythology: Based on H.J. Rose's "Handbook of Greek Mythology", Psychology Press, 2004, . Google Books.
 Kerényi, Carl, The Heroes of the Greeks,  Thames and Hudson, London, 1959.

External links

 Heracles at the Livius Picture Archive
 The Labors of Hercules at the Perseus Digital Library

 
12 (number)
Hercules
 :es:Mosaico de los trabajos de H%C3%A9rcules